William James Atessis (born July 16, 1949) is a former American football player who played on two NCAA national championship teams at the University of Texas. One of the most honored and productive defensive ends in NCAA history, he was a three-year starter and was a second-team All-American as a junior and a consensus All-American as a senior. He currently resides in Houston, Texas.

High school career 
Atessis attended Jesse Jones High School, in Houston. He graduated in 1967. He was a Texas All-State tackle in 1966. Atessis was the state's number one lineman in the recruiting class of 1967. He was an all-around athlete who excelled in football, baseball, and basketball. He was inducted to the Texas High School Sports Hall of Fame in 1995. In 1996 was named as one of the best lineman in the history of Texas high school football, ranking second on the Houston Chronicle list.

College career 
Atessis was a member of teams which set a school record 30-game winning streak that currently stands as the twelfth-longest in NCAA history and was a three-year letterman and three-year starter at left defensive end. Including two years as a starter on the  back-to-back National Champion Texas Longhorns teams of 1969 and 1970. Was voted Longhorn Defensive MVP by the Dallas Morning News and Houston Post both in 1969 and 1970.

The Longhorns also won three consecutive Southwest Conference championships and appeared in three consecutive Cotton Bowl Classic games, winning two during that time. Was a consensus 1st Team All-American in 1970 and was second-team All-American in 1969. in 1970 he was voted  Southwest Conference Co-Lineman of the Year (with Arkansas All-American Defensive end, Dick Bumpas). Consensus All-SWC choice in 1969 and 1970. Also was a finalist for Outland Trophy and finished fifth in the voting for the UPI Lineman of the Year, both in 1970.

Played in the Senior Bowl in Mobile, Alabama, in January 1971. Is a member, University of Texas Men's Athletics Hall of Honor, being voted in during 2001. Texas Coach Darrell Royal called him a, "Super player, who hasn't played a bad game in three years." Played in the Coaches' All-America Game in Lubbock, Texas, June 28, 1971. Singled out for his "tremendous game" by the Odessa American as worthy of the player of the game award.

Played in what has been called "The Game of the Century" between #1 Texas and #2 Arkansas on December 6, 1969, with the Longhorns winning 15-14. In 2005 was named to the All-Time University of Texas team by the Austin American-Statesman and was named to the Red River Rivalry All-time team by the Fort Worth Star-Telegram, also in 2005. In 2006, he was named number 16 on a list of the 50 best names in Texas Longhorn history.

NFL 
He was highly regarded after a stellar collegiate career. Was drafted by the NFL Champion Baltimore Colts. He was injured in training camp and released in mid-season. Played defensive end for the New England Patriots in 1971. Asked to drop weight and move to outside linebacker, a position he had never played. Left camp in July 1972, and was dealt to the St. Louis Cardinals. Was moved to offensive line there and asked to gain back the weight he lost to play linebacker. Was injured again and released by Cards. Signed as a defensive tackle by the Jets for the 1973 season yet was cut in training camp.

Time line
 Second-round draft choice by NFL Baltimore Colts (52nd overall pick) on January 28, 1971
 Added to the injured waived list by the Colts on September 9, 1971.
 Placed on injured reserve by the Colts on September 16, 1971.
 Released by the Colts on October 4, 1971.
 Signed by the New England Patriots, November 15, 1971, and assigned to the taxi squad.
 Signed to the active roster November 20, 1971, and played 5 games with the New England Patriots, 1971
 Switched to linebacker by Patriots, lost weight to 240 pounds
 Voluntarity left New England Patriots camp, July 16, 1972
 Acquired by the St. Louis Cardinals on July 19, 1972, for a future draft choice
 Switched to offensive guard, asked to get weight back to 255
 Placed on injured reserve by the Cardinals on August 8, 1972
 Cut by the Cardinals, September 13, 1972
 Signed by the New York Jets on May 10, 1973, moved to defensive tackle
 Released by the Jets on August 7, 1973

Notes 
 Wore uniform number 77 while at Texas
 Along with two other Texas All-Americans, Bobby Wuench and Steve Worster, criticized Notre Dame players of being "poor sports" in a 21–17 loss to the Longhorns in the 1970 Cotton Bowl Classic.
 Was in the real estate business in Santa Cruz, California, in the late 1980s and early 1990s.
 Featured in 2005 book Texas Longhorns: Where Have You Gone? by Whit Canning, published in 2005.

References

1949 births
Living people
Players of American football from Houston
American football defensive ends
Texas Longhorns football players
All-American college football players
New England Patriots players